No Hero, may refer to:

 "No Hero: The Evolution of a Navy SEAL", an autobiography by Matt Bissonnette, author of No Easy Day
 "No Hero", a song on the Offspring's album Ignition
 No Hero (comics), a comic series by Warren Ellis
 No Hero, a 1992 South African film starring Steve Hofmeyr
 No Hero, a novel series by the author Yu Wo
 "No Hero" (Elisa song), 2016 song

See also
No Heroes, a 2006 album by Converge
No Heroics, a 2008 British comedy about superheroes